Heintzelman is a surname. Notable people with the surname include:

Ken Heintzelman (1915–2000), American baseball player
Samuel P. Heintzelman (1805–1880), United States Army General
Stuart Heintzelman (1876–1935), American soldier
Tom Heintzelman (born 1946), American baseball player

See also
Heintzelman Boulevard (Goldenrod Road Extension), toll road in southeastern Orlando, Florida, United States
USS General Stuart Heintzelman (AP-159), transport ship for the U.S. Navy in World War II
Heintzman (disambiguation)